Time for Citizenship is a free website, initiated in 1999 by Primary schools in the UK and Ireland. Since then, the site has expanded somewhat and now has a membership of over 4,000 schools. Its central tenets are to teach children to learn: 
to respect themselves, to respect others’ values and beliefs, to respect their environment, and to respect the law of the land.

Schools interact and share 'best practice' by submitting outstanding projects and children's Artwork. There are currently 38 projects featured on the site from the UK, France, South Africa, Australia, India, Romania, Poland, Spain, Belarus, Greece, Canada, Lithuania, Ireland, Austria, Latvia and Portugal. The site is supported by the Treasury in the UK, HSBC, Microsoft and CSEF. Schools and children receive prizes for their entries. A problem page exists for children to pose problems and be answered by their peers - a fine example of Peer Mediation.

The site has been endorsed by many of the UK and Ireland's leading politicians.

External links
Time for Citizenship 

British educational websites